Maryville College is a private liberal arts college in Maryville, Tennessee.  It was founded in 1819 by Presbyterian minister Isaac L. Anderson for the purpose of furthering education and enlightenment into the West.  The college is one of the 50 oldest colleges in the United States and the 12th-oldest institution in the South.  It is associated with the Presbyterian Church (USA) and enrolls about 1,100 students.  Maryville College's mascot is the Scots.  The sports teams compete in NCAA Division III athletics in the Collegiate Conference of the South.

Academics

As a liberal arts school, the college promotes a well-rounded education. The school requires numerous general education courses to achieve this. The courses are taken through the conclusion of the student's education, contributing to the graduating student's becoming knowledgeable in a number of fields.

Maryville College is one of the few colleges in the nation that requires graduating students to complete a comprehensive exam in their major and conduct an extensive senior thesis.

U.S. News & World Report in its Best Colleges ranks Maryville #3 in Regional Colleges South, #1 in Best Colleges for Veterans, and #2 in Best Undergraduate Teaching.

History

Founding
Maryville College was founded as the Southern and Western Theological Seminary in 1819 by Isaac L. Anderson, a Presbyterian minister. Anderson had founded a school, Union Academy, in nearby Knox County, before becoming minister at New Providence Presbyterian Church in Maryville. He expressed to his fellow clergy the need for more ministers in the community, including a request to the Home Missionary Society and an appeal to divinity students at Princeton University in 1819. The new seminary was intended to help fill this need for ministers. It opened with a class of five men, and the new school was adopted by the Synod of Tennessee and formally named the Southern and Western Theological Seminary in October 1819.

Integration
In 2004, Maryville College was recognized by the Race Relations Center of East Tennessee for its history of "contributing to improving the quality of life for all in East Tennessee". Maryville College was racially integrated from its earliest days. An ex-slave named George Erskine studied there in 1819, sponsored by the Manumission Society of Tennessee. Erskine went on to preach during the 1820s and was formally ordained by the General Assembly of the Presbyterian Church in 1829.

Maryville College was closed during the Civil War, but, upon reopening, it again admitted students regardless of race, assisted by the Freedmen's Bureau.

When the State of Tennessee forced Maryville College to segregate in 1901, the college gave $25,000—a little more than a tenth of its endowment at the time—to Swift Memorial Institute, the college's sister school. Swift was founded by William Henderson Franklin, the first African American to graduate from Maryville College (1880). His institute educated black students during the era of imposed segregation.

After the Brown v. Board of Education decision in 1954, Maryville College immediately re-enrolled African Americans.

In 1875, Maryville College conferred the first college degree to a woman in the state of Tennessee. The recipient was Mary T. Wilson, the older sister of Samuel T. Wilson, who later served as president of the college from 1901 until 1930.

Campus

Maryville College is located in the City of Maryville, Blount County, Tennessee. Its current campus was established in 1869 on a  that was then on the city's outskirts. Several campus buildings were completed over the next five decades, with financial help from major institutions and philanthropists. The college's historic buildings comprise the Maryville College Historic District, which was listed on the National Register of Historic Places in 1982; Anderson Hall is also separately listed on the National Register.

Buildings on campus
Anderson Hall: The oldest building on campus, Anderson Hall houses the Humanities and Education departments. Donations for its construction came from the Freedmen's Bureau and philanthropists William Thaw, a Pittsburgh industrialist, and John C. Baldwin of New York.
Thaw Hall: Thaw Hall was completed in 1923 with donations from Mary Thaw of Pittsburgh. It functions as the campus library, as well as housing the Academic Support Center, Social Sciences, and Environmental Studies departments. 
Cooper Athletics Center: This building currently houses the Athletics department, as well as the Cooper Success Center.
Fayerweather Hall: Originally a science building, this building is named for Daniel B. Fayerweather of New York, who provided funds for its construction. It was designed by Baumann Brothers of Knoxville and completed in 1898. Fayerweather now houses most of the administrative offices of Maryville College, as well as the AJB Financial Aid office.
Bartlett Hall: Built by Kin Takahashi and many other students, this building houses the offices of Student Development, Student Involvement, Resident Life, Center for Calling and Careers, The Learning center, Security, the book store, the Post Office, Multicultural Center, and Isaac's Cafe.
Pearsons Hall: This building houses the main dining hall and two floors of residential housing.
Sutton Science Center: The building houses the departments of Math, Chemistry, Biology, Psychology, American Sign Language, and Deaf Studies.
Clayton Center for the Arts: This building is the newest building at MC. It houses the music department and has live acts, plays, and local and national productions.
Willard House: This building houses the office of Advancement.
The House in the Woods: This building is used for the meeting space at MC. This building was previously used to house the campus minister.
Alexander House: This building houses some Advancement offices, Church Relations, Youth Leadership Blount, and Keep Blount Beautiful.
Crawford House: This building houses Mountain Challenge, LLC.
Ruby Tuesday (RT) Lodge: Since 1997, this building has been used as a private corporate retreat for the company Ruby Tuesday.
Alumni Gym: This building is used to house campus events.
Physical Plant: This is where all campus maintenance offices are located. 
Center for Campus Ministry: This building houses the campus chapel and is the office of the campus Minister, Volunteer relations, and several other "volunteer" related officers.

Campus housing
The vast majority of Maryville College students reside in one of the many on-campus residence halls, which are:

Gamble Hall: All male; typically freshman housing.  Rooms are available as both doubles and singles. Also features communal bathrooms.
Davis Hall: All female; typically freshman housing.  Rooms are available as both doubles and singles. Also features communal bathrooms.
Copeland Hall: Co-ed; typically freshman housing.  Rooms are available as both doubles and singles. Also features communal bathrooms.
Pearsons Hall: renovated for residential use on the second level in 2015.
Lloyd Hall: Primarily upper class, Lloyd Hall offers suite-style living.  These rooms are composed of a living room, two bathrooms, and either two doubles or a double and two singles.  Some rooms also contain kitchens.
Carnegie Hall: Upper class living that includes suites in which two room share a kitchen and bathroom as well as single rooms in which a bathroom is shared by three residents.
Beeson Village: A complex of primarily upper class residences. Beeson Village offers apartment style living and is one of the newer campus living accommodations.
Court Street Apartments: Located just off campus, Court Street Apartments offer single bedroom apartments shared by two students.
Gibson Hall: The newest residence hall at Maryville College, which offers suite style living almost identical to that of Lloyd Hall.  Gibson Hall is a "wellness hall", which means that students must refrain from drinking, smoking, and drug use within the building.
All residence halls besides Copeland, Davis, Gamble, and Gibson allow alcohol to those of age.

Campus improvement plan
In 2010 Maryville College finished the construction of the Clayton Center for the Arts. This new CCA building is home to a large theatre, a flex theatre, and also classrooms and offices for professors of Maryville College. There are also plans to renovate Anderson Hall beginning June 2013. The renovations will focus on the interior and are estimated to be completed by August 2014.

Features of the college

The college's heating system started as an experiment by the Tennessee Valley Authority, the Department of Energy and the college in 1982. Coinciding with the World's Fair in Knoxville, the experiment tested the efficiency of burning wood waste as an energy source. Tours of the plant and demonstrations were held at the college.

The college's oldest building, Anderson Hall, built in 1870, is currently used as a classroom building. It is listed on the National Register of Historic Places.

Crawford House is an LEED Gold certified building, and it is the oldest of 5 existing buildings to be made so in Tennessee.

Athletics
Maryville College sponsors 16 varsity sports under the guidelines of NCAA Division III. Varsity sports include men's and women's soccer, men's and women's cross country, women's volleyball, men's and women's basketball, men's and women's golf, men's and women's tennis, baseball, softball, and the newest sports of men's and women's outdoor track and field effective in 2022–23. Maryville also sponsors a varsity women's equestrian team; while that sport is recognized by the NCAA as part of its Emerging Sports for Women program, Division III has yet to incorporate equestrian into the Emerging Sports program. Finally, Maryville lists its female cheerleaders (but not its male cheerleaders) and all-female dance team as varsity teams on its athletic website. 

Maryville previously competed in the Great South Athletic Conference, with football competing in the USA South Athletic Conference. All teams began competing in the USA South in fall 2012.

At the end of the 2021–22 school year, the USA South underwent an amicable split. Ten of the then 19 members remained in the USA South, and eight members, including Maryville, formed the new Collegiate Conference of the South (CCS). (One other member left for a third conference.) With football and women's golf not being sponsored by CCS, Maryville continues to house those sports in the USA South.

In football, Maryville played in the 1947 Tangerine Bowl – the inaugural playing of what is now the Citrus Bowl – losing 31–6 to Catawba College.

Weekend programs
The East Tennessee Japanese School (イーストテネシー補習授業校 Īsuto Teneshī Hoshū Jugyō Kō), a weekend Japanese education program, holds its classes at the college. It opened in August 1989, as the Blount County (ブラントカウンティ) Japanese School. In 1990 the school used Maryville students as volunteer instructors; according to Kumiko Franklin, the principal, there were 40 such volunteers applying for four positions.

Notable alumni
Frank Moore Cross, a Professor Emeritus of the Harvard Divinity School, notable for both his work in the interpretation of the Dead Sea Scrolls as well as his analysis of the Deuteronomistic History (DH).
Edwin Cunningham, United States Consul General in Shanghai (1920-1935)
Donald West Harward, President of Bates College.
Dorothy Andrews Elston Kabis, The 33rd Treasurer of the United States (1969–1971), appointed by President Richard Nixon.
Sen Katayama, co-founder of Japanese Communist Party
Roy Kramer, former Commissioner of the Southeastern Conference.
David W. Marston, attorney and author
Katherine O. Musgrave (1920–2015), Professor Emerita of food and nutrition, University of Maine
Wiley Blount Rutledge, Associate Justice of United States Supreme Court from 1943 to 1949.
Tom Saffell, Major League Baseball player from 1949 to 1959.
Richard B. Sellars (1915–2010), Chairman and CEO of Johnson & Johnson.
Kirtanananda Swami, prominent guru in the Hare Krishna movement
Roy Arthur Taylor, U.S. Representative from North Carolina, 1960–1977
George Verwer, Evangelist and founder of Operation Mobilisation
Ron Wolf, former General Manager of the NFL's Green Bay Packers
Kin Takahashi (1866/67-1902), football player and missionary who fundraised and built the third YMCA in the South on the Maryville campus.

References

External links

 Official website
 Maryville College official athletics website
 

 
Liberal arts colleges in Tennessee
Maryville, Tennessee
Private universities and colleges in Tennessee
Schools in Blount County, Tennessee
Universities and colleges affiliated with the Presbyterian Church (USA)
Buildings and structures in Blount County, Tennessee
National Register of Historic Places in Blount County, Tennessee
University and college buildings on the National Register of Historic Places in Tennessee
Universities and colleges accredited by the Southern Association of Colleges and Schools
Education in Blount County, Tennessee
Educational institutions established in 1819
1819 establishments in Tennessee